Hy-Vee, Inc. is an employee-owned chain of supermarkets in the Midwestern and Southern United States, with more than 280 locations in Iowa, Illinois, Kansas, Minnesota, Missouri, Nebraska, South Dakota, Wisconsin, and soon Indiana, Kentucky, Tennessee, and Alabama. Hy-Vee was founded in 1930 by Charles Hyde and David Vredenburg in Beaconsfield, Iowa, in a small brick building known as the Beaconsfield Supply Store, which is listed on the National Register of Historic Places.

The largest Hy-Vee stores are full-service supermarkets with bakeries, delicatessens, floral departments, dine-in and carryout food service, wine and spirits, pharmacies, health clinics, HealthMarkets (natural and organic products) and coffee kiosks (Caribou Coffee and Starbucks). The company maintains fuel stations with convenience stores, fitness centers, and full-service restaurants at some of its properties, including Wahlburgers, a chain made famous by the same-titled A&E reality series.

Hy-Vee's longtime advertising slogan, "Where there's a helpful smile in every aisle," was adopted for the chain's first television commercial in 1963. The slogan became a jingle in the 1990s with music by Annie Meacham and James Poulsen.

History

Early years and General Supply Company

Starting in 1917, Vredenburg & Lewis, David Vredenburg's previous partnership, operated stores as part of the General Supply Company, an RLDS Church-owned company based in Lamoni, Iowa.

In 1921, Charles Hyde started working for the General Supply Company's store in Woodbine, Iowa, which was operated by Vredenburg & Lewis. In 1922, the General Supply Company was formally incorporated. Vredenburg was president and Hyde was a member of the board of directors. In 1924, Hyde left the General Supply Company and started his store in Cameron, Missouri.

In 1927, Hyde purchased a half stake of a store in Kellerton, Iowa, the other half being owned by the General Supply Company. In 1930, Vredenburg and Hyde started a separate partnership from the General Supply Company, named Supply Stores, and opened their first store in Beaconsfield, Iowa.

In 1932, The General Supply Company was dissolved because of the effects of the Great Depression. Vredenburg purchased most of the former General Supply Company's remaining stores and mill. Both Hyde and Vredenburg owned and operated other stores outside of their partnership. Hyde and Vredenburg's partnership was dissolved for approximately six months in 1935 after Iowa enacted the Chain Tax Act of 1935, a heavy tax against chain stores that was later declared unconstitutional.

In 1938, Hyde & Vredenburg, Inc. was officially incorporated, with 15 stores in Iowa and Missouri. The incorporation consolidated all of Hyde's and Vredenburg's independently owned stores with the stores they had in their partnership. The company was headquartered in Lamoni. The new company's management plan involved autonomy for store managers, setting the stage for its eventual employee ownership.

In 1945, Hyde & Vredenburg moved its corporate headquarters from Lamoni to Chariton, Iowa, after acquiring the Chariton Wholesale Company.

The Supply Store name, with each town's name preceding it, was still used on most stores until 1952. A few stores were named differently, with names such as Hyde's Service Store, Vredenburg's Grocery, and Hyde & Vredenburg, all of which were changed in 1952.

1950s and 1960s
The Hy-Vee name, a contraction of Hyde and Vredenburg, was adopted in 1952 as the winning entry of an employee contest, with three employees submitting the name. The first store with the name opened in Fairfield, Iowa, in 1953. In 1956, Hy-Vee introduced its first private label products, along with a new logo. In 1957, Hy-Vee opened its first in-store bakery at the Iowa City, Iowa, store.

In 1960, the company became employee-owned by the Employees’ Trust Fund. The slogan "Where There's a Helpful Smile in Every Aisle" was first used in a TV commercial in 1963. The company's name was officially changed to Hy-Vee Food Stores, Inc., in 1963.

In 1969, Hy-Vee expanded into Minnesota, after acquiring the Swanson Stores chain based in Cherokee, Iowa. In 1969, Hy-Vee opened its first Drug Town, a pharmacy separate from a regular store, in Cedar Rapids, Iowa. Hy-Vee had 66 stores at the end of 1969.

1970s, '80s, and '90s

Hy-Vee continued expanding during the 1970s and 1980s, opening stores in South Dakota (1975), Nebraska (1977), Illinois (1979), and Kansas (1988). In 1975, Hy-Vee's 100th store, which was also its first to use electronic cash registers, opened in Keokuk, Iowa. By the end of 1989, Hy-Vee had 172 stores in seven states. In 1994, Hy-Vee updated its logo to the one used today.

In 1995 Hy-Vee moved its corporate headquarters from Chariton to West Des Moines, Iowa, while shortening its name to Hy-Vee, Inc. The company's primary distribution center is still in Chariton; a second one is in Cherokee, Iowa.

Famous NFL Quarterback Kurt Warner worked at a store in Cedar Falls, Iowa from 1994 to 1995, before going to play in Arena Football for the Iowa Barnstormers.

2000s
At the turn of the millennium, Hy-Vee increased its focus on customers' healthy lifestyles. HealthMarket private-label products were introduced in 2001. The company also began its initiative to provide customers with the services of corporate and in-store dietitians.

Stores began offering an expanded line of ethnic foods to the Midwest's increasingly diverse population. Online shopping capabilities expanded in 2005, with a redesigned Hy-Vee website offering online shopping for such items as holiday meals, floral arrangements, and catering selections; gift cards were added in 2006.

Hy-Vee was selected as Progressive Grocer's Retailer of the Year in 2003. Drug Town stores were renamed Hy-Vee Drugstores in 2005. Hy-Vee celebrated its 75th anniversary in 2005 with the publication of a second company history book (The History of Hy-Vee). In 2007, Hy-Vee's first store, in Beaconsfield, Iowa, was placed on the National Register of Historic Places.

In the fiscal year 2009, Hy-Vee had sales exceeding $6.3 billion; at the time, it was the second-largest employee-owned company in the United States and ranked by Forbes magazine the 48th-largest privately owned company in the country. More than 55,000 employees worked in the Hy-Vee family in 2009.

By the end of 2009, there were 228 stores. In 2009, Hy-Vee moved into its eighth state of operations when the store in Madison, Wisconsin, opened. Hy-Vee's fourth president, Randy Edeker, was selected to lead the company in December 2009. Ric Jurgens retained the titles of chairman and chief executive officer until 2012 when Edeker assumed those roles.

In 2003, Milan, Illinois, based grocer Eagle Food Center went out of business, and a few of their stores, such as the John Deere Road store in Moline, Illinois, became Hy-Vee stores in the late 2000s.

2010s
In 2010, Hy-Vee expressed interest in building/opening a store in Joplin, Missouri, but the plans fell through when the developer would not negotiate traffic signal installation. Despite this, they still remained interested in the area, but according to a Facebook reply in 2016, they currently have no plans for the Joplin area.

In 2012, Hy-Vee introduced its loyalty program, Hy-Vee Fuel Saver, which allows customers to earn discounts on fuel at Casey's General Stores; Shell; PDQ/Kwik Trip, as well as Hy-Vee's own gas stations, by purchasing select items. 
Later that year, Hy-Vee started to add full-service restaurants to some stores, named Hy-Vee Market Grille.

In 2015, Hy-Vee brought online shopping to all stores with the introduction of their new website, Hy-Vee Aisles Online. The company's loyalty program adopted Hy-Vee Fuel Saver + Perks branding.

In September 2015, Hy-Vee opened its first stores in the Minneapolis–Saint Paul metropolitan area.

In 2016, Hy-Vee began opening clothing boutiques featuring Tesco's F&F brand in select larger locations.

In 2017, Hy-Vee became the exclusive retailer in its service area for sports nutrition products marketed by Mark Wahlberg. This expanded into a deal-making Hy-Vee a franchisee for Wahlburgers restaurants; the first location under the deal opened in May 2018 at the Mall of America in Bloomington, Minnesota.  Hy-Vee plans to operate 26 Wahlburgers locations, making it the largest franchisee of Wahlburgers.  Hy-Vee's restaurant, Market Grille, added Wahlburgers items to its menu.

Hy-Vee opened its first standalone HealthMarket store in 2018.  Much like the in-store health department, also named HealthMarket, the standalone store focuses on health and wellness.  The store is a smaller format than regular Hy-Vee stores and contains a pharmacy and attached Orangetheory Fitness.

In 2018, the first-ever Hy-Vee Dollar Fresh store opened up in Osceola, Iowa. This concept offers customers in smaller communities a fresh, new product selection at low prices. Customers will find a full selection of grocery items, a bakery section with a full range of fresh-baked items, a dollar section, a Wall of Value, ready-to-eat meal offerings, and other services.

In 2018, the first-ever Hy-Vee Fast & Fresh convenience store opened up in Davenport, Iowa. This concept offers many standard grocery items for the pantry and freezer, plus fresh produce, dairy, meat and bakery departments. There's also a gas station, Hy-Vee Aisles Online pickup, wood-oven pizza, Nori sushi, a craft beer station, wine and spirits section, made-to-order meals for carryout or dining in, take-and-heat meal options, Hy-Vee Mealtime Kits, a Starbucks with a drive-thru and much more are also featured. The Hy-Vee & Fresh store is not 24/7 like Hy-Vee as it closes at the end of the night and reopens in the morning. In some markets, Hy-Vee Fast & Fresh will have some competition with Walmart Neighborhood Market, launched in 1998, that is similar to the Fast & Fresh concept.

In 2019, Hy-Vee announced it would start opening Joe Fresh clothing sections in stores and replace its previous F&F clothing departments.

2020s

On January 27, 2020, Hy-Vee agreed to acquire six former Shopko locations in Iowa that will re-open under the Dollar Fresh brand by late summer.

On February 10, 2020, Hy-Vee grocery stores ended their 24-hour service at most locations. Most of the 24-hour stores are closed between midnight and 5 a.m., though hours vary by location. The stores still have stock crews working overnight, but the stores are not open to the public.

On February 19, 2020, Hy-Vee acquired four QuikTrip convenience store locations in the Des Moines metro that re-opened under the Hy-Vee Fast & Fresh Express brand on March 20, 2020.

In August 2021, Hy-Vee announced a new standalone liquor store named Wall to Wall Wine and Spirits, with plans to open four stores in West Des Moines, Iowa, Papillion, Nebraska, Omaha, Nebraska, and Lincoln, Nebraska.

In September 2021, Hy-Vee opened a 92,989-square-foot flagship store in Grimes, Iowa.  The "smart store" contains new technology for Hy-Vee, including scan-and-go shopping, salad making robot vending machine, digital shelf labels, and self-serve kiosks which allow customers to order bakery items, hot food, or fitness equipment. The store also has experimental ideas including a cigar room, a new design for the hot food area inspired by food halls, fitness equipment from Johnson Fitness & Wellness, redesigned wine and spirits section, DSW shoe department, and nail salon named The W Nail Bar. Also in  the same month the chain opened a similar store in Eau Claire, Wisconsin. This location was the first opened in the state outside of the Madison area.

In November 2021, Hy-Vee received several awards from the Technology Association of Iowa at their annual Prometheus Awards ceremony.  Hy-Vee won the following awards: CEO of the Year, Creative Technology Solution of the Year, and Software Development Technology Company of the Year.

In December 2021, Hy-Vee expressed interest in a former Shopko location in Ashwaubenon, Wisconsin by applying for liquor licenses. The nearly 125,000 square foot store opened on November 8, 2022, and is the largest in the chain by square footage. It is the fourth location in Wisconsin.

In December 2021, Hy-Vee launched a new subsidiary RedBox Rx which provides telehealth online pharmacy services, and ships prescriptions directly to patients’ homes.

In December 2021, Hy-Vee announced it would close four locations.  Two locations, one in Cedar Rapids, Iowa and one in Moline, Illinois (acquired in the 2000s as part of the Eagle Food Center bankruptcy) will be closed permanently.  A store in Kansas City, Missouri will be converted into a Wall to Wall Wine and Spirits location, and another in Sioux Falls, South Dakota will be renovated into a non-retail bakery and pharmacy fulfillment location.

In December 2021, Hy-Vee announced plans to expand into four new states, with plans to open at least 21 new stores by 2025 with seven of these 21 to open no later than 2023, in the following markets: Indianapolis, Indiana, Louisville, Kentucky, Huntsville, Alabama, Knoxville, Tennessee, Nashville, Tennessee, and Memphis, Tennessee. Their primary competitors in the south will be Cincinnati, Ohio-based Kroger and Lakeland, Florida-based Publix.  Hy-Vee specified it has no plans to open stores within H-E-B's trade territory of Texas. Hy-Vee also plans to build a third distribution center in Nashville, their first outside of Iowa, which will service the seven new stores, as well as southern Missouri.  Hy-Vee had originally planned to build a third distribution center in Austin, Minnesota but those plans were put on hold indefinitely.

In December 2021, Hy-Vee expanded its online offering by introducing ship-to-home services.  Customers are now able to purchase bulk grocery items directly from the Hy-Vee Deals website, and a pet specific website named Petship was also launched.

In February 2022, Hy-Vee opened its long-awaited, second, Springfield, Missouri store.

In March 2022, Hy-Vee announced a new location in Spring Hill, Tennessee, its first location in the state.

On July 27, 2022, the announcement was made that Randy Edeker was stepping down from current position as CEO and Aaron Wiese will be assuming the role of CEO.  Randy Edeker will remain chairman of the board.

Information and statistics
Hy-Vee is known to move departments into separate buildings for legal requirements, or optimal customer service. This is commonly seen in the construction of a separate building for Hy-Vee Gas, usually near the main store. It is also common for Hy-Vee to have attached liquor stores, as in Minnesota, where grocery stores are not allowed to sell alcoholic beverages over 3.2% alcohol by weight. In some cases, there is a completely separate building for the liquor department, such as the Prairie Village, Kansas store, where the liquor store is across the street (State Line Road) in Kansas City, Missouri and thus operates under Missouri's more liberal alcohol laws.

Hy-Vee ranked second on the National Center for Employee Ownership's list of Largest Employee Owned Companies in 2011. Hy-Vee ranked 27th on Forbes magazine's annual list of the largest privately owned companies in the United States in 2017. Hy-Vee ranked 27th on "Top 75 North American Food Retailers" by Supermarket News in 2016. Hy-Vee ranked 4th on America's Favorite Grocery Retailers by Market Force Information in 2016.

Hy-Vee won numerous awards in 2017, including recognition by Forbes as one of America's Best Employers. Forbes also named Hy-Vee as one of the top 50 private companies in the United States. Hy-Vee ranked as the sixth favorite Grocery Retailer in America by Market Force in 2017. Progressive Grocer selected Hy-Vee as its Retailer of the Year in 2017, while Mass Market Retailers appointed Hy-Vee as the 2017 Retail Innovator of the Year.

In 2021, Hy-Vee was ranked by Forbes magazine as the 24th largest privately owned company in the United States.

As of 2021, Hy-Vee Inc. has more than 91,000 employees and 285 retail stores. It has annual sales of more than $12 billion.

Presidents and CEOs
Hy-Vee has had five Presidents and four CEOs in its 91-year history

Dwight Vredenburg, son of founder David Vredenburg, became Hy-Vee's first president at 23 years old and served in that role for 45 years.
 President: 1938–1983
 CEO: 1978–1989
 Chairman of the Board: 1978–1989
Ron Pearson, Hy-Vee's second President and CEO. During his time, Hy-Vee expanded its services to include gas stations, dry cleaning, takeout meals and added online shopping.
 President: 1983–2001
 CEO: 1989–2003
 Chairman of the Board: 1989–2006
Ric Jurgens, Hy-Vee's third President and CEO. Hy-Vee focused on healthy living during this time, adding pharmacies, clinics, dietitians, and health food sections to stores.
 President: 2001–2009
 CEO: 2003–2012
 Chairman of the Board: 2006–2012
Randy Edeker, Hy-Vee's fourth President and CEO. Since 2012, Hy-Vee has renovated many of its stores, introduced the Hy-Vee Fuel Saver program, and emphasized expanding online shopping.
 President: 2009–2021
 CEO: 2012–present
 Chairman of the Board: 2012–present
Jeremy Gosch, Hy-Vee's fifth President. In December 2021, Hy-Vee announced that Jeremy would be promoted to President of Hy-Vee, with Randy Edeker continuing to serve as CEO and chairman of the board.
 President: 2021–present

Sponsorships
Hy-Vee has been a major sponsor of road racing—especially woman's half marathons. The company sponsors a series of half marathons for women, which takes place in the cities of Kansas City, Omaha, Des Moines, and St. Paul.

On May 17, 2018, the Kansas City Star reported that Hy-Vee purchased the naming rights to the iconic Kemper Arena in Kansas City, Missouri. The renovated Hy-Vee Arena is slated to be an Adult and Youth sports facility.

In 2020, Hy-Vee began sponsoring a car for the Rahal Letterman Lanigan Racing Team in the IndyCar Series for Graham Rahal at the race at Iowa Speedway and Spencer Pigot at the Indianapolis 500. In 2021 Hy-vee sponsored Santino Ferrucci for five races including the 105th Indianapolis 500 and Oliver Askew for three race in the No. 45. As of 2022, Hy-Vee is the title sponsor of the No. 45 Hy-Vee Honda driven by Jack Harvey and a prominent associate sponsor for teammates Graham Rahal and Christian Lundgaard in the No. 15 and 30 cars respectively.

Hy-Vee purchased the naming rights to the Iowa Events Center's exhibition hall, named Hy-Vee Hall in 2001; the venue was completed in December 2004.

Hy-Vee serves as title or presenting sponsor for multiple major sporting events:
 the Iowa–Nebraska football rivalry is officially branded as the Hy-Vee Heroes Game (2011–present)
 Hy-Vee IndyCar Race Weekend, a three-day race weekend featuring the IndyCar Series held at Iowa Speedway in Newton, Iowa. The weekend is headlined by two races, the Hy-VeeDeals.com 250 presented by DoorDash on Saturday and the Hy-Vee Salute to Farmers 300 presented by Google on Sunday. Each race was accompanied with concerts before and after it with Tim McGraw, Florida Georgia Line, Gwen Stefani, and Blake Shelton performing in 2022. (2022-present)
  Hy-Vee Classic, an annual doubleheader in Des Moines, Iowa, involving Iowa's four Division I men's basketball teams - Iowa, Iowa State, Drake, and Northern Iowa (2018)
 Drake Relays, athletics event held at Drake University in Des Moines, Iowa (2013–2019)

Hy-Vee previously served as title or presenting sponsor for multiple now-defunct sporting events:
 Hy-Vee Classic, a Women's Senior Tour event (2000–2006)
 Hy-Vee Triathlon, an Olympic-distance triathlon (2007–2014)

Hy-Vee serves as a sponsor for multiple cultural events in the Des Moines area:
 80/35 Music Festival - Main Stage sponsor since 2015
 Des Moines Arts Festival
 Iowa State Fair

In October 2017, Hy-Vee was named the official grocery, pharmacy, and floral partner of the NBA's Minnesota Timberwolves, WNBA's Minnesota Lynx and the G-League's Iowa Wolves.

In July 2015, Hy-Vee was named the official grocery, pharmacy, and floral partner of the NHL's Minnesota Wild.

Hy-Vee was named a founding partner for U.S. Bank Stadium and official partner of the NFL's Minnesota Vikings in August 2015. This partnership includes prominent signage in the new stadium.

Hy-Vee also serves as a sponsor for 38 colleges and universities over its eight-state region.

Hy-Vee served as a sponsor of Major League Baseball's Kansas City Royals from 2001 to 2016.

In 2009, Hy-Vee replaced Price Chopper as the official grocery store of the NFL's Kansas City Chiefs.

Subsidiaries
Throughout its history, Hy-Vee has vertically integrated its retail operations by acquiring several companies that provide services to its stores. Hy-Vee's subsidiaries are:
 Midwest Heritage Bank, FSB, with branch locations and offices in Iowa
 Purchased the National Bank & Trust Company of Chariton in 1963. The name was changed to Midwest Heritage Bank in 1995.
 Midwest Heritage Bank is one of the only non-Industrial Loan Company banks in the U.S. to be owned by a retailer. It is an OCC Regulated Federal Savings Association (SA), also known as a Federal Savings Bank.
 Lomar Distributing, Inc., a specialty food distributor based in Des Moines 
 Acquired in 1990
 Perishable Distributors of Iowa, Ltd., a distributor of meat, seafood, cheese and dairy items based in Ankeny, Iowa
 Became an affiliate in 1982 and a subsidiary of Hy-Vee in 1990
 D & D Foods, Inc., a supplier of freshly prepared salads, dips, meat, and entree items based in Omaha, Nebraska
 Originally named D & D Salads, Inc., this subsidiary was purchased in 1992
 Florist Distributing, Inc., a distributor of flowers and plants based in Des Moines, Iowa
 Became a subsidiary in 1992
 Hy-Vee Construction, L.C., a construction company based in Des Moines
 Partially purchased Weitz Construction in 1995 and named Hy-Vee/Weitz Construction L.C. Purchased the remaining share of the company in 2013, officially forming a subsidiary.
 A+ Communications
 Surveillance, Security Systems, and Home Audio 
 Amber Pharmacy
 Hy-Vee Pharmacy Solutions and Amber Pharmacy began a partnership in 2009. Amber Pharmacy was fully purchased in 2014.
 Vivid Clear Rx
 Became a subsidiary in 2020
 Wall to Wall Wine and Spirits
 Became a subsidiary in 2021

Notes

References

External links
 Official Site

Hy-Vee
Privately held companies based in Iowa
American companies established in 1930
Retail companies established in 1930
Economy of the Midwestern United States
Employee-owned companies of the United States
Supermarkets of the United States
1930 establishments in Iowa
Retailers' cooperatives in the United States
West Des Moines, Iowa